Sinitsyno is a rural locality (a village) in Zelentsovskoye Rural Settlement, Nikolsky District, Vologda Oblast, Russia. The population was 34 as of 2002.

Geography 
Sinitsyno is located 65 km northwest of Nikolsk (the district's administrative centre) by road. Malinovka is the nearest rural locality.

References 

Rural localities in Nikolsky District, Vologda Oblast